Stomoxyn is an insect antimicrobial peptide localised in the gut epithelium, which functions in killing a range of microorganisms, parasites and some viruses. In water, stomoxyn has a flexible random coil in structure, while in trifluoroethanol it adopts a stable helical structure. Structural similarities to the antimicrobial peptide cecropin A from Hyalophora cecropia suggest that it may function in a similar manner by disrupting the bacterial membrane.

References

Antimicrobial peptides
Protein families